Jordan Lisle (born 12 July 1990) is a former Australian rules football player who played with Hawthorn Football Club, and Brisbane Lions in the Australian Football League, and the Port Melbourne Football Club in the Victorian Football League

Drafted
A strong-marking forward who has the ability to play back. Lisle was a competitive and courageous player who has solid skill level. A Vic Metro under-18 representative in 2008, culminating in selection in the All-Australian under-18 team.

AFL career

2011: Debut
He made his debut for the Hawks in Round 11 of the 2011 AFL season against Fremantle. Lisle was a late inclusion after star forward Lance Franklin withdrew because of a calf injury. He kicked his first AFL goal in Round 24 against Gold Coast. On 17 October, Lisle was traded to the Brisbane Lions.

Brisbane
Relocating to Brisbane in 2012, Lisle continued his development as a key forward with the Reserves in the State League competition. He played in the final five matches of the season for the seniors. Lisle was eligible to return to the Reserves side in time to help them claim the 2012 NEAFL Premiership. He kicked 5 goals against the NT Thunder in the Grand Final, the following week he kicked eight goals in the Inter-Conference Championship win.

Post-AFL
After being delisted, Lisle signed with Port Melbourne in the Victorian Football League in 2015. He kicked 42 goals in the 2015 season to be a joint winner of the Frosty Miller Medal, then 46 goals in 2017 to win the medal outright. Winning it again in 2019, for a third time.

Family
Jordan is the son of former North Melbourne ruckman Mark Lisle.

Statistics

|- style=background:#EAEAEA
| 2009 ||  || 36
| 0 || — || — || — || — || — || — || — || — || — || — || — || — || — || — || 0
|-
| 2010 ||  || 36
| 0 || — || — || — || — || — || — || — || — || — || — || — || — || — || — || 0
|- style=background:#EAEAEA
| 2011 ||  || 36
| 5 || 1 || 3 || 32 || 24 || 56 || 32 || 7 || 0.2 || 0.6 || 6.4 || 4.8 || 11.2 || 6.4 || 1.4 || 0
|-
| 2012 ||  || 19
| 5 || 4 || 4 || 37 || 29 || 66 || 26 || 5 || 0.8 || 0.8 || 7.4 || 5.8 || 13.2 || 5.2 || 1.0 || 0
|- style=background:#EAEAEA
| 2013 ||  || 19
| 8 || 11 || 5 || 52 || 38 || 90 || 35 || 14 || 1.4 || 0.6 || 6.5 || 4.8 || 11.3 || 4.4 || 1.8 || 0
|-
| 2014 ||  || 19
| 5 || 0 || 0 || 52 || 22 || 74 || 32 || 6 || 0.0 || 0.0 || 10.4 || 4.4 || 14.8 || 6.4 || 1.2 || 0
|- class="sortbottom"
! colspan=3| Career
! 23 !! 16 !! 12 !! 173 !! 113 !! 286 !! 125 !! 32 !! 0.7 !! 0.5 !! 7.5 !! 4.9 !! 12.4 !! 5.4 !! 1.4 !! 0
|}

Honours and achievements
Team
 NEAFL premiership player: 2012

Individual
 3× Jim 'Frosty' Miller Medal: 2015, 2017, 2019
 Under–18 All-Australian team: 2008

References

External links

1990 births
Hawthorn Football Club players
Box Hill Football Club players
Brisbane Lions players
Port Melbourne Football Club players
Living people
Australian rules footballers from Victoria (Australia)
People educated at Carey Baptist Grammar School